Franz Schmitt (born 5 September 1937) is a German wrestler. He competed in the men's Greco-Roman lightweight at the 1964 Summer Olympics.

References

External links
 

1937 births
Living people
German male sport wrestlers
Olympic wrestlers of the United Team of Germany
Wrestlers at the 1964 Summer Olympics
People from Aschaffenburg
Sportspeople from Lower Franconia